The 2018 Stockton Challenger was a professional tennis tournament played on outdoor hard courts. It was the third and fourth editions of the tournament and was part of the 2018 ATP Challenger Tour and the 2018 ITF Women's Circuit. It took place in Stockton, United States, on 1–7 October 2018.

Men's singles main draw entrants

Seeds

 1 Rankings are as of September 24, 2018.

Other entrants
The following players received wildcards into the singles main draw:
  Jenson Brooksby
  Tom Fawcett
  Philip Hjorth
  Thai-Son Kwiatkowski

The following player received entry into the singles main draw as a special exempt:
  James Duckworth

The following player received entry into the singles main draw as an alternate:
  Kaichi Uchida

The following players received entry from the qualifying draw:
  William Blumberg
  Patrick Kypson
  Tommy Paul
  Alexander Sarkissian

Women's singles main draw entrants

Seeds 

 1 Rankings as of 1 October 2018.

Other entrants 
The following players received a wildcard into the singles main draw:
  Hayley Carter
  Victoria Duval
  Jamie Loeb
  Danielle Willson

The following players received entry into the singles main draw using a junior exempt:
  Whitney Osuigwe

The following players received entry from the qualifying draw:
  Maegan Manasse
  Sanaz Marand
  Amra Sadiković
  Katie Volynets

The following player received entry as a lucky loser:
  Jennifer Elie

Champions

Men's singles

 Lloyd Harris def.  Marc Polmans 6–2, 6–2.

Women's singles

 Madison Brengle def.  Danielle Lao, 7–5, 7–6(12–10)

Men's doubles

 Darian King /  Noah Rubin def.  Sanchai Ratiwatana /  Christopher Rungkat 6–3, 6–4.

Women's doubles

 Hayley Carter /  Ena Shibahara def.  Quinn Gleason /  Luisa Stefani, 7–5, 5–7, [10–7]

External links 
 2018 Stockton Challenger at ITFtennis.com
 Official website

2018 ITF Women's Circuit
2018 ATP Challenger Tour
2018 in sports in California
Tennis tournaments in California
Sports competitions in Stockton, California